Liberman's lemma is a theorem used in studying intrinsic geometry of convex surface.
It is named after Joseph Liberman.

Formulation

If  is a unit-speed minimizing geodesic on the surface of a convex body K in Euclidean space then for any point p ∈ K, the function

 

is concave.

References
Либерман, И. М. «Геодезические линии на выпуклых поверхностях». ДАН СССР. 32.2. (1941), 310—313.

Differential geometry of surfaces
Lemmas